The 1915 Iowa State Cyclones football team represented Iowa State College of Agricultural and Mechanic Arts (later renamed Iowa State University) in the Missouri Valley Conference during the 1915 college football season. In their first season under head coach Charles Mayser, the Cyclones compiled a 6–2 record (2–1 against conference opponents), finished in third place in the conference, shut out four of eight opponents, and outscored opponents by a combined total of 129 to 75. They played their home games at State Field in Ames, Iowa. Edward John was the team captain.

Schedule

References

Iowa State
Iowa State Cyclones football seasons
Iowa State Cyclones football